Oleksandr Korniyenko (born 12 May 1984) is a Ukrainian politician, First Deputy Chief of the Verkhovna Rada of Ukraine, a former Head of the Servant of the People political party. Co-chair of the Ukraine-NATO Interparliamentary Council. One of the rulers of Decentralization Reform and Public Administration Reform in Ukraine. Supports the development of youth policy in Ukraine. Has more than 10 years’ experience in business coaching and development consulting. Was elected to the Verkhovna Rada of Ukraine in 2019.

Education 
In 2001, Oleksandr Korniyenko entered the National Technical University of Ukraine “Igor Sikorskyi Kyiv Polytechnic Institute”. In 2007, he received a Master’s Degree in Chemical Technology and Engineering. In 2008 he was enrolled to the Ukrainian Center, the Wiesbaden Academy of Psychotherapy in Germany. Had been studying for 2 years, in 2010 Mr. Korniyenko graduated as a consulting psychologist. In 2015, he continued to study at the School of Existential Coaching, and in 2018 graduated as a consulting coach in existential approach. 2 years later, in 2020 Oleksandr Korniyenko was enrolled to the Educational and Scientific Institute of Public Administration and Civil Service of Taras Shevchenko National University of Kyiv for a postgraduate course, completing it with the dissertation topic “Models of Territorial Organization of Public Authority: A Comparative Analysis”.

Professional and political activity

Career

From 2001 to 2008 Korniyenko worked as a journalist and organising festivals. In 2008, he started to work as a private entrepreneur in the field of adult and business education, team building and business games. From 2019 to the present day, he has been working as a civil servant.

Political activity

From 2005 till 2006, Korniyenko was a Deputy Chair of the youth wing of the Reforms and Order party (right-wing liberals). Then, in 2009 he became a member of the Front for Change party (centrist) being a volunteer for 2 years. Later, he worked as a consultant to the Secretariat (Christian Democrats) in DemAlliance Party for two years till 2017. In 2018 Korniyenko joined the Servant of the People party (ALDE member), ZeTeam (the team of Volodymyr Zelenskyi). In 2019, he became a Head of the election headquarters of the Servant of the People political party as well as an MP candidate from the party of the same name in the 2019 parliamentary elections, No. 7 on the list. In July 2019, he was elected MP of Ukraine, IX convocation. From August 2019 till October 2021 Korniyenko was the First Deputy Head of the mono-majority faction – "Servant of the People" – in the Verkhovna Rada of Ukraine, the Head of the Subcommittee on the Organization of State Power of the Verkhovna Rada of Ukraine Committee on State Building, Local Governance, Regional and Urban Development. During the period from November 2019 till November 2021 he was the Head of the Servant of the People (ALDE member) party. Since October 19, 2021, Korniyenko has held the position of the First Deputy Speaker of the Verkhovna Rada of Ukraine.

International activity

Korniyenko is a Co-chair of the NATO-Ukraine Interparliamentary Council (UNIC). He holds the position of Head of the Delegation of the Verkhovna Rada of Ukraine to the Inter-Parliamentary Union (IPU) as well as a position of Head of the Delegation of the Verkhovna Rada of Ukraine to the Interparliamentary Assembly of the Association of Southeast Asian Nations (ASEAN). Korniyenko works to deepen inter-parliamentary cooperation in the Global South, in particular with the countries of Southeast Asia.

Student and youth work

In regard to social activities in the period from 2001 till 2005 Korniyenko was a student self-government of National Technical University of Ukraine “Igor Sikorskyi Kyiv Polytechnic Institute”. Later, since 2004 till 2005 he had been holding a position of a spokesperson of the student strike committee during the Orange Revolution. From 2005 till 2010 he was a leader of the all-Ukrainian youth organization Union of Initiative Youth. During the period since 2013 till 2014 he had been a participant in the Revolution of Dignity. From 2016 till 2018 he took part in the GoCamp initiative by GoGlobal (language volunteers from all over the world to Ukraine). In 2016 Korniyenko founded NGO Youth Projects Exchange.

Political position and achievements 
Takes an active position on public administration reform in Ukraine and decentralization of power. Supports the development of youth policy in Ukraine. During the current parliamentary term, he was involved in the implementation of key reforms (judicial, land, anti-corruption, economic, decentralization, electoral reforms, etc.), in the removal of artificial barriers – bureaucratic, procedural, political – to these reforms. As a representative of the leadership of the Ukrainian parliament, he is actively involved in the implementation of legislative changes and European integration reforms for Ukraine’s early accession to the European Union.

Marital status 
Married, has two daughters.

See also 
 List of members of the parliament of Ukraine, 2019–24

References

External links 
 Personal website
 Verkhovna Rada (in Ukrainian)
 
 Oleksandr Korniyenko on Twitter

1984 births
Living people
Politicians from Kyiv
Kyiv Polytechnic Institute alumni
Businesspeople from Kyiv
21st-century Ukrainian businesspeople
Ukrainian campaign managers
Servant of the People (political party) politicians
Ninth convocation members of the Verkhovna Rada
Deputy chairmen of the Verkhovna Rada
Leaders of political parties in Ukraine
21st-century Ukrainian politicians